Bulbine abyssinica is a species of plant in the genus Bulbine, from eastern and southern Africa.

Description
A small geophyte, with an underground stem, and a tuft of slender leaves that appear in a rosette above the ground. 
The leaves are slender, succulent and cylindrical (200mm long; 5mm broad).

The 50 cm tall inflorescence appears in early Summer, or after rains. The yellow flowers are carried at the top of it. Like all Bulbine species, the stamens are distinctively tufted ("bearded").

Distribution
This species is widespread across southern and eastern Africa, where it grows in rocky soils. In the south, it grows as far as the town of Worcester, South Africa.

References

Flora of South Africa
abyssinica